Pintsch is a village in the commune of Kiischpelt, in northern Luxembourg.  , the village has a population of 162. It was the site of intense fighting between German and American troops in the January 1945, and one of the last sites of conflict of the Battle of the Bulge, being reduced to ruins by the fighting.

References

Kiischpelt
Villages in Luxembourg